Sammarçolles is a commune in Vienne, Nouvelle-Aquitaine, France. The small town lies northeast of Loudun, 6.5 kilometres by road. It contains a "rich chapel", built by the Montault des Isles family.
686 people were recorded in 1886. The population declined in the 20th century to a low of 472 people in 1990. As of 2017 it has a population of 642 people.

Demographics

See also
Communes of the Vienne department

References

Communes of Vienne